In the field of hyperbolic geometry, the order-6 hexagonal tiling honeycomb is one of 11 regular paracompact honeycombs in 3-dimensional hyperbolic space. It is paracompact because it has cells with an infinite number of faces.  Each cell is a hexagonal tiling whose vertices lie on a horosphere: a flat plane in hyperbolic space that approaches a single ideal point at infinity.

The Schläfli symbol of the hexagonal tiling honeycomb is {6,3,6}.  Since that of the hexagonal tiling of the plane is {6,3}, this honeycomb has six such hexagonal tilings meeting at each edge.  Since the Schläfli symbol of the triangular tiling is {3,6}, the vertex figure of this honeycomb is a triangular tiling.  Thus, infinitely many hexagonal tilings meet at each vertex of this honeycomb.

Related tilings 

The order-6 hexagonal tiling honeycomb is analogous to the 2D hyperbolic infinite-order apeirogonal tiling, {∞,∞}, with infinite apeirogonal faces, and with all vertices on the ideal surface.
 

Symmetry 

The order-6 hexagonal tiling honeycomb has a half-symmetry construction: . 

It also has an index-6 subgroup, [6,3*,6], with a non-simplex fundamental domain. This subgroup corresponds to a Coxeter diagram with six order-3 branches and three infinite-order branches in the shape of a triangular prism: .

Related polytopes and honeycombs 
The order-6 hexagonal tiling honeycomb is a regular hyperbolic honeycomb in 3-space, and one of eleven paracompact honeycombs in 3-space.

There are nine uniform honeycombs in the [6,3,6] Coxeter group family, including this regular form. 

This honeycomb has a related alternated honeycomb, the triangular tiling honeycomb, but with a lower symmetry:  ↔ .

The order-6 hexagonal tiling honeycomb is part of a sequence of regular polychora and honeycombs with triangular tiling vertex figures:

It is also part of a sequence of regular polychora and honeycombs with hexagonal tiling cells:

It is also part of a sequence of regular polychora and honeycombs with regular deltahedral vertex figures:

Rectified order-6 hexagonal tiling honeycomb 

The rectified order-6 hexagonal tiling honeycomb, t1{6,3,6},  has triangular tiling and trihexagonal tiling facets, with a hexagonal prism vertex figure.

it can also be seen as a quarter order-6 hexagonal tiling honeycomb, q{6,3,6},  ↔ .

It is analogous to 2D hyperbolic order-4 apeirogonal tiling, r{∞,∞} with infinite apeirogonal faces, and with all vertices on the ideal surface.

Related honeycombs
The order-6 hexagonal tiling honeycomb is part of a series of honeycombs with hexagonal prism vertex figures:

It is also part of a matrix of 3-dimensional quarter honeycombs: q{2p,4,2q}

Truncated order-6 hexagonal tiling honeycomb 

The truncated order-6 hexagonal tiling honeycomb, t0,1{6,3,6},  has triangular tiling and truncated hexagonal tiling facets, with a hexagonal pyramid vertex figure.

Bitruncated order-6 hexagonal tiling honeycomb 

The bitruncated order-6 hexagonal tiling honeycomb is a lower symmetry construction of the regular hexagonal tiling honeycomb,  ↔ . It contains hexagonal tiling facets, with a tetrahedron vertex figure.

Cantellated order-6 hexagonal tiling honeycomb 

The cantellated order-6 hexagonal tiling honeycomb, t0,2{6,3,6},  has trihexagonal tiling, rhombitrihexagonal tiling, and hexagonal prism cells, with a wedge vertex figure.

Cantitruncated order-6 hexagonal tiling honeycomb 

The cantitruncated order-6 hexagonal tiling honeycomb, t0,1,2{6,3,6},  has hexagonal tiling, truncated trihexagonal tiling, and hexagonal prism cells, with a mirrored sphenoid vertex figure.

Runcinated order-6 hexagonal tiling honeycomb 

The runcinated order-6 hexagonal tiling honeycomb, t0,3{6,3,6},  has hexagonal tiling and hexagonal prism cells, with a triangular antiprism vertex figure.

It is analogous to the 2D hyperbolic rhombihexahexagonal tiling, rr{6,6},  with square and hexagonal faces:

Runcitruncated order-6 hexagonal tiling honeycomb 

The runcitruncated order-6 hexagonal tiling honeycomb, t0,1,3{6,3,6},  has truncated hexagonal tiling, rhombitrihexagonal tiling, hexagonal prism, and dodecagonal prism cells, with an isosceles-trapezoidal pyramid vertex figure.

Omnitruncated order-6 hexagonal tiling honeycomb 

The omnitruncated order-6 hexagonal tiling honeycomb, t0,1,2,3{6,3,6},  has truncated trihexagonal tiling and dodecagonal prism cells, with a phyllic disphenoid vertex figure.

Alternated order-6 hexagonal tiling honeycomb

The alternated order-6 hexagonal tiling honeycomb is a lower-symmetry construction of the regular triangular tiling honeycomb,  ↔ . It contains triangular tiling facets in a hexagonal tiling vertex figure.

Cantic order-6 hexagonal tiling honeycomb 

The cantic order-6 hexagonal tiling honeycomb is a lower-symmetry construction of the rectified triangular tiling honeycomb,  ↔ , with trihexagonal tiling and hexagonal tiling facets in a triangular prism vertex figure.

Runcic order-6 hexagonal tiling honeycomb

Runicantic order-6 hexagonal tiling honeycomb

See also 
 Convex uniform honeycombs in hyperbolic space
 Regular tessellations of hyperbolic 3-space
 Paracompact uniform honeycombs

References 

Coxeter, Regular Polytopes, 3rd. ed., Dover Publications, 1973. . (Tables I and II: Regular polytopes and honeycombs, pp. 294–296)
 The Beauty of Geometry: Twelve Essays (1999), Dover Publications,  (Chapter 10, Regular Honeycombs in Hyperbolic Space) Table III
 Jeffrey R. Weeks The Shape of Space, 2nd edition  (Chapter 16-17: Geometries on Three-manifolds I,II)
 Norman Johnson Uniform Polytopes, Manuscript
 N.W. Johnson: The Theory of Uniform Polytopes and Honeycombs, Ph.D. Dissertation, University of Toronto, 1966 
 N.W. Johnson: Geometries and Transformations, (2018) Chapter 13: Hyperbolic Coxeter groups

Hexagonal tilings
Honeycombs (geometry)
Self-dual tilings